Euglandina anomala is a species of predatory air-breathing land snail, a terrestrial pulmonate gastropod mollusk in the family Spiraxidae.

Subspecies 
 Euglandina anomala barrocoloradensis Pilsbry, 1930

References

Spiraxidae
Gastropods described in 1879